is a town located entirely on Yonaguni Island in Yaeyama District, Okinawa Prefecture, Japan.  It is the westernmost municipality in Japan, and is known for billfish fishing and as a diving spot. In 1987, divers discovered the Yonaguni Monument, a rock formation that some believe may be man-made.

It is also home to two Ryūkyūan writing systems, pictographic "kaida-di" (also used on Ishigaki and Taketomi islands where it is called "kaida-ji") and the symbols used to indicate family names, "dāhan" (also used on Ishigaki Island where they are called "yāban").

History
Presently, the oldest confirmed ruins are the ruins in Tuguru Beach. Due to the southern style stone tools found, it is thought that a culture influenced by Southeast Asia existed here at one time.

After this point, the history of the island of Yonaguni is unclear, but in the Gusuku Era, settlements were formed on the top of the plateau.  The Shima Nakamura Ruins are one example, and it is known for being the birth village of the famous woman chief, San’ai Isoba.

From the time of the Ryūkyū Kingdom, Yonaguni prospered as a commerce center with Taiwan. Due to World War II, until it was placed under control of the United States Civil Administration of the Ryukyu Islands, the number of people involved in smuggling surged in the area.  The population in 1947 had reached 12,000, but although Yonaguni became incorporated as a town, a crackdown on smuggling led to a sharp decrease in the population.

Ishigaki and the surrounding towns and cities are discussing a merger, with the exception of Yonaguni which abstained, cutting the members of parliament from 12 in half, down to 6.
 1522: Yonaguni was Invaded by the Ryūkyū army and became a territory of the Ryūkyū Kingdom.
 1872: The Ryūkyū Kingdom is abolished; in its place, the Ryūkyū Domain is established and the island becomes a territory of the Ryūkyū Domain.
 1879: The Ryūkyū Domain is abolished and becomes Okinawa-ken.
 1908: The island municipal system abolishes the magiri system, and the Ishigaki-magiri, Ōhama-magiri, and Miyara-magiri join the island of Yonaguni to become Yaeyama-son.
 1914: Through a division of Yaeyama-son, the village of Yonaguni-son is formed.
 1948: Yonaguni-chō is incorporated as a town.

Geography
 Yonaguni is the westernmost part of Japan and is a midpoint between the island of Ishigaki and Taiwan.  At Cape Irizaki (Yonagunian language: Irinzati) on the western edge of the island, there is a monument inscribed with the words: "The westernmost point in Japan."
 The western third of the island is not part of Japan's air defense identification zone or flight information region; instead, it sits in Taiwan's air defense identification zone and flight information region.  (Please refer to the article on Yonaguni Airport for more details.)
Due to this, it is attempting to establish closer relations with Taiwan, including attempting to set up easier access to and from cities in Taiwan, with irregular service to Hualien already established. Further cooperation has been opposed by the central government, thus the lack of further progress.

Rivers
 Tahara River (Okinawa)

Population

Climate

Administration
 Mayor Shukichi Hokama

Transportation

Airport
Yonaguni Airport
Japan Transocean Air (JTA) – JAL group
Ishigaki Airport 30 min., one round trip flight daily (Boeing 737-400)
Ryūkyū Air Commuter (RAC) – JAL and JTA groups
Naha Airport 80 min., four round trip flights per week (Bombardier Dash 8 DHC-8-100)
Ishigaki Airport 30 min., four round trip flights per week (Bombardier Dash 8 DHC-8-100)

Harbours
Kubura Harbour
Fukuyama Maritime "Ferry Yonakuni"
Ishigaki Harbour 4 hr. 30 min. (only two round trips per week)
Naha Harbour (irregular schedule)

Sonai Harbour

Roads
Okinawa Prefectural Road 216 – Yonaguni Island Route
Okinawa Prefectural Road 217 – Yonaguni Harbor Route

(Rental cars are available)

Bus
 Yonaguni Transit

Region

Education
Yonaguni Elementary School
Kubura Elementary School
Hikawa Elementary School
Yonaguni Junior High School
Kubura Junior High School – Japan's westernmost school

Because there are no high schools on the island, students entering high school must attend on the Okinawa mainland or on the island of Ishigaki, and 100% of junior-high schoolers continue on to high school.

Famous places and historic sites
Agarizaki (Eastern Cape)
Irizaki (Western Cape)
Tachigami-iwa (Standing God Rock)
Gunkan-iwa (Battleship Rock)
Kubura-bari (crack in the rock at Kubura)
The open set of the TV drama series, Dr. Cotō’s Clinic
Sanninu-dai (Sanninu Tower)
Tōyama-jinja (Ten Mountain Shrine) – Japan's westernmost Shinto shrine

Yonaguni Monument

Animals of special significance
 Yonaguni horse – One of eight traditional Japanese horses, the smallest horse in Japan. Unable to be seen anywhere other than the island of Yonaguni.
 Atlas moth – Called ayami habiru locally, this is the world's largest moth.  In Japan, it is found only in Yonaguni.

Broadcasting
Television broadcasts consist of translator stations in Yonaguni and Uchimichi and radio broadcasts are established from the Yonaguni television translator station.  It is also the only place in Japan where all three NHK Radio stations are on the FM band.  In addition, Yonaguni receives Taiwanese television broadcasts (Taiwan Television (TTV), China Television (CTV), and Chinese Television System (CTS)), along with Taiwanese radio broadcasts.

List of broadcast station frequencies

TV translator frequencies

Radio translator frequencies (MHz)

Other information
Through the cell towers on the east side of Taiwan that are geographically close to Yonaguni, it is possible depending on the weather to receive GSM phone service on Taiwanese phones from Irizaki (and it is possible that GSM phones from international carriers could use the service while roaming).

External links

 Yonaguni Homepage

References

Bibliography
 

 
Towns in Okinawa Prefecture